National Highway 354E, commonly referred to as NH 354E is a national highway in  India. It is a spur road of National Highway 54. NH-354E traverses the state of Punjab in India.

Project development
The Ministry of Road Transport and Highways has approved rehabilitation and widening of existing road to 2 lanes with paved shoulders. The project also involves construction of a major high level bridge. The project is estimated to cost 322.48 crore rupees and is required to be executed at engineering, procurement, and construction mode. 32.15 crore has been allocated for felling of 10,650 trees and compensatory afforestation.

Route 
Dabwali, Sito Gunno, Abohar.

Junctions  
 
  Terminal near Dabwali.
  Terminal near Abohar.

See also 

 List of National Highways in India
 List of National Highways in India by state

References  

National highways in India
National Highways in Punjab, India